"The Night's Too Long" is a song written and performed by American singer-songwriter Lucinda Williams. It was released in 1989 as the second single from her third album, Lucinda Williams (1988). 

The song was recorded by American country music artist Patty Loveless. It was released in 1990 as the second single from her fourth studio album On Down the Line.

Content
The song is about a restless young woman decides to move from her small town to the big city, where she can take in the nightlife and meet the man of her dreams. The first part of the song has her sacrificing to set up her move, which takes place in the second half of the song. Her new office job (in the song's third verse) takes a back seat to her going out to the bars, where she dances and eventually consummates a relationship with the man she had been looking for.

Critical reception
Robin Denselow, writing in The Guardian, called the song an "epic narrative", stating that it "echoes Springsteen at his best."

Track listing
7" single
 "The Night's Too Long" – 4:15
 "Price to Pay" – 2:46

Patty Loveless version

Critical reception
Lisa Smith and Cyndi Hoelzle described the song favorably in Gavin Report, where they wrote that "Patty plaintively sings the story of a woman trying to break out of her small-town life."

Track listing
7" single
 "The Night's Too Long" – 	3:56
 "Overtime	" – 2:48

Charts
The song charted for 19 weeks on the Billboard Hot Country Singles & Tracks chart, reaching No. 20 during the week of December 8, 1990.

References

External links
, official audio (no music video)

1989 singles
1990 singles
Lucinda Williams songs
Patty Loveless songs
Song recordings produced by Tony Brown (record producer)
Songs written by Lucinda Williams
Rough Trade Records singles
MCA Nashville Records singles
Music videos directed by John Lloyd Miller
1988 songs